Bankura Christian College, established in 1903, is the oldest college in Bankura district in India. It offers undergraduate courses in arts and sciences. It is affiliated with the Bankura University.

History

Bankura Christian College was established by the Wesleyan Missionary Society in 1903 to prepare students for the F. A. Examination only. On July 16, 1906, by the Honourable Mr. Lancelot Hare, Officiating Lieutenant-Governor of Bengal, laid the foundation stone of the college building on a land of 115 bighas near the center of the town. It was the first college to be established in Bankura district.

The application from the Wesleyan Mission College, Bankura, for affiliation to the Calcutta University was granted in April 1907. The affiliation was for the standard of the Intermediate Examination in Arts in the subjects of English, Sanskrit, History, Logic and Mathematics and up to the B. A. Standard in the subjects of English, Sanskrit, History, Political Economy and Political Philosophy and Mental and Moral Philosophy, and also up to the standard of the F. A. Examination in 1908 in the subjects of English, Sanskrit, History, Logic, Mathematics and Physics and Chemistry.

In 1961, the affiliation was changed to Burdwan University and since 2017, the college  is affiliated to Bankura University.

Departments

Science
Chemistry
Physics
Mathematics
Computer Science
Electronics
Zoology
Nutrition
Physiology
Geography
Botany
Economics

Arts
Bengali
English
Sanskrit
History
Physical Education
Political science
Philosophy
Sociology

B.PEd

Real-time weather reporting
The Geography Department started real-time weather reporting of Bankura District in 2012.

Netaji Subhas Open University
Bankura Christian College is an authorized study center of Netaji Subhas Open University (N.S.O.U.) since 1999. Subjects available under N.S.O.U. at Bankura Christian College are as follows:

Master of Arts
Bengali
English
English Language Teaching
Pol. Science
History
Public Administration
Social Work

Master of Science
Mathematics

Master of Commerce
Commerce

Bachelor of Arts
Bengali
English
English Language Teaching
Pol. Science
History
Public Administration
Social Work

Certificate course
Bachelor's Preparatory Programme

Bachelor of Library Science (BLIS)
Library Science

Computer center
The college has introduced Webel Informatics Ltd to manage computers.

Journals
The English Department publishes two international journals: Wesleyan Journal of Research and Appropriations Journal.

Notable alumni
 Dinesh Chandra Gorai, former Bishop of Calcutta
 Khudiram Das, scholar, educationist, critic, litterateur, an authority on Rabindra literature and linguistic expert.
 Manik Bandopadhyay, notable writer, novelist.
 Gouri Sankar Bandyopadhyay, Historian.
 Balaram Mukhopadhyay, Scientist
 Maniklal Sinha, archaeologist of Rarh, freedom fighter, novelist and writer.

See also

References

External links

Colleges affiliated to Bankura University
Educational institutions established in 1903
Universities and colleges in Bankura district
Universities and colleges affiliated with the Church of North India
Christian universities and colleges in India
1903 establishments in India